Clumsy is an album by the American band Samiam, released in 1994 on Atlantic Records. The band had been the subject of a bidding war, following the early 1994 success of Green Day; it was Samiam's first album for a major label.

Clumsy'''s first single was "Capsized". The band promoted the album by opening for Bad Religion on the Stranger Than Fiction tour. Clumsy sold around 13,000 copies in its first six months of release.

Production
The album was produced by Lou Giordano.

Critical receptionThe Washington Post thought that "if not bursting with originality, such tunes as 'As We're Told' and 'Bad Day' are nonetheless appealingly energetic and melodic." The Philadelphia Inquirer determined that "Samiam favors a thick power-chord attack that supports lithe, wrenching and surprisingly melancholy vocals ... The result is music that wallops and cries at the same time."The Gazette concluded: "No problems here with their Westerberg Jr. angst nor their rock ambitions, but if '94 is the year punk 'broke,' '95 is the year it will be broken." The Press-Enterprise stated that Clumsy'' "flows between hard-core punk and hippie grunge with lyrics telling of childhood pain and misery."

AllMusic wrote that "'As We're Told' and 'Bad Day' swell with monstrous punk hooks; meanwhile, two slower numbers, 'Tag Along' and 'Cradle' are, respectively, dreamy and angry enough while still retaining can't-miss melodicism."

Track listing

Personnel
Jason Beebout - vocals
James Brogan - guitar
Victor Indrizzo - drums
Sergie Loobkoff - guitar
Aaron Rubin - bass

References

1994 albums
Samiam albums
Atlantic Records albums
Albums produced by Lou Giordano